Steven Douglas Kreisman (September 24, 1938 – April 19, 1993) was an American saxophonist and flautist. He was a member of the famed Los Angeles session musicians known as the Wrecking Crew. As a Los Angeles session musician, he worked with Phil Spector, Bob Dylan, Brian Wilson, The Beach Boys and Ry Cooder.

Biography
Douglas can be heard on records by Duane Eddy, Aretha Franklin, Elvis Presley, Willy DeVille, Bob Dylan, The Beach Boys, The Ramones and many others. He was also a record producer, having produced Mink DeVille's Le Chat Bleu, as well as tracks for Wayne Newton and The Lettermen.

On April 19, 1993, while warming up with Ry Cooder, Douglas collapsed and died. Heart failure was the official cause of death. He was 54.

It became a tradition for Darlene Love to perform "Christmas (Baby Please Come Home)" for Christmas on the Late Show with David Letterman with Douglas's sax from the original recording being played by Bruce Kapler. This tradition continued through December 19, 2014, when it had been announced that Letterman would be retiring in May, 2015.

Awards
In 2003, Douglas was inducted into the Rock and Roll Hall of Fame.

Selected discography

As leader
 Popeye Twist And Stomp, 1962
 Twist with Steve Douglas and the Rebel Rousers, 1962
 Reflections In A Golden Horn, 1969
 The Music Of Cheops, 1976
 Rainbow Suite, 1981
 Hot Sax, 1982
 King Cobra, 1984
 Beyond Broadway, 1991

As sideman, albums
The Beach Boys: Pet Sounds; 15 Big Ones; Keepin' the Summer Alive
Dion DiMucci : Born to Be with You, Streetheart
Bob Dylan: Street Legal; Bob Dylan at Budokan; Shot of Love; Knocked Out Loaded
Duane Eddy: Have 'Twangy' Guitar Will Travel
Sammy Hagar: Street Machine
Mink DeVille: Cabretta; Return to Magenta; Le Chat Bleu
The Ramones: End of the Century
Leonard Cohen: Death of a Ladies' Man

As sideman, singles
The Crystals : He's a Rebel

References

External links

American clarinetists
American flautists
American session musicians
American rock saxophonists
American male saxophonists
1938 births
1993 deaths
Musicians from Los Angeles
The Wrecking Crew (music) members
Jewish American musicians
Philles Records artists
20th-century American saxophonists
20th-century American male musicians
Mercury Records artists
20th-century flautists
The T-Bones members